The Ghost Hunt (German: Die Geisterjagd) is a 1918 German silent crime film directed by Johannes Guter and starring Ernst Reicher, Esther Carena and Aruth Wartan. It is part of a long-running series of films featuring the detective Stuart Webbs.

It was shot at the Weissensee Studios in Berlin.

Cast
 Ernst Reicher as Stuart Webbs
 Esther Carena as Juanita
 Ernst Laskowski
 Frida Richard
 Lina Salten
 Aruth Wartan

References

Bibliography
 Alfred Krautz. International directory of cinematographers, set- and costume designers in film, Volume 4. Saur, 1984.

External links

1918 films
Films of the German Empire
German silent feature films
Films directed by Johannes Guter
German black-and-white films
1918 crime films
German crime films
1910s German films
Films shot at Weissensee Studios
1910s German-language films